The River Swale in Yorkshire, England, is a major tributary of the River Ure, which becomes the River Ouse, that empties into the North Sea via the Humber Estuary. The river gives its name to Swaledale, the valley through which it flows.

The river and its valley are home to many types of flora and fauna typical to the Yorkshire Dales. Like similar rivers in the region, the river carves through several types of rock and has features typical of both river and glacial erosion. The River Swale has been a contributory factor in the settlements that have been recorded throughout its history. It has provided water to aid in the raising of crops and livestock, but also in the various mining activities that have occurred since Roman times and before.

The river is said to be the fastest flowing in England and its levels have been known to rise  in 20 minutes. Annual rainfall figures average 1800 mm p.a. in the headwaters and 1300 mm p.a. in the lower waters over a drop of 148 m in 32 km.

Course 

The source of the Swale is at the confluence of the Birkdale Beck and the Great Sleddale Beck. The river flows north-north-east past lead mines on its northern bank and the end of Whitsundale and then eastwards towards the first of many waterfalls in the headwaters. After flowing over Wain Wath Force the river continues south-east over Hoggarts Leap and Catrake Force near Keld, before it reaches East Gill Force and Kisdon Force. Shortly after Swinner Gill joins the river it swings sharply south towards the village of Muker where Straw Beck joins and the river turns east again. The river flows past Gunnerside towards Feetham where it turns north-east for a short while before returning east past Healaugh, Reeth and Grinton. The river then swings gently south-east and east below Marrick before turning north-eastward and then north past Marske.

The Swale returns eastward near Hudswell before it flows past the main town of the valley, Richmond. It starts a series of long south-east meanders past Brompton-on-Swale and passes under the A1 at Catterick Bridge before turning south past Catterick. The river continues long south and south-east meanders past Thrintoft and Morton-on-Swale. As it starts to pursue a more constant southerly flow it is joined by the River Wiske before passing Skipton-on-Swale, Catton, Topcliffe and Asenby. It then flows past Helperby and Myton-on-Swale before joining the River Ure.

River levels 

 Low and High Water Levels are an average figure.

Natural history 

The River Swale and its valley support a range of habitats including broadleaved, mixed and conifer woodland as well as hay meadows and grasslands. Limestone scar, bracken, scrub and heather moorland can also be found. Amongst the species of tree that can be found are ash, birch, rowan and bird cherry along with shrubs such as hawthorn, hazel and holly. There are smaller populations of yew and sycamore. Pine, larch and spruce occur mostly in plantations with alder and willow common along the river banks. The many hay meadows are filled with buttercup species and wood cranesbill.

Geology 

There are three distinct geological areas in Upper and Mid Swaledale. The upper reaches of the river flow over Carboniferous, Permian and Triassic rock, all of which are atop a layer of Lower Paleozoic beds. These rocks are rich in minerals and metalliferous sulfide ores such as galena, sphalerite, chalcopyrite and bravoite. There are also deposits of fluorite, barite, witherite, calcite, dolomite and barytocalcite.

Along the valley sides can be seen the typical Dales geology of Yoredale beds, alternating strata of limestone and gritstone. Small seams of coal, particularly around Tan Hill, have been found and worked. During the last Ice Age, the glacier that dominated the valley was responsible for broadening it and altering the course of the river around Keld and Round Howe. It was also responsible for cutting the Kisdon gorge. Retreat moraines lower in the river valley can be seen around Gunnerside and Grinton Bridge.

History 

The earliest evidence of occupation in the river valley can be dated to the Mesolithic and Neolithic Ages with the discovery of flint tools and arrowheads. Around Harkerside are some small stone circles that date to the Bronze Age and some Iron Age defensive earthworks. Evidence of lead mining has been traced back to Roman times with finds at the Hurst mine. This industry seemed to decline until after the Norse (Danish) invasions of the area. During the major ecclesiastical building of the 12th and 13th centuries, lead became a valuable commodity and mining once again increased in the valley. Evidence of the lead mining can still be seen from the remains of the 18th-century practice of 'hushing' that involved creating turf dams across gills that were then released to wash away topsoil to expose the ore veins.

It was part of the Votadini Celtic kingdom of Catraeth, but in the late 6th century the river valley was invaded by Angles who took the settlement at Catraeth (now Catterick). Warriors from the Celtic Gododdin kingdom to the north attempted to dislodge them, but failed to do so at the Battle of Catraeth. The Angles then established themselves at Reeth, Stainton, Grinton Bridge and Fremington. By the mid-9th century the area had been invaded by Norsemen who settled first the lower and then the upper valley. After the Norman invasion, the lands of the valley were given to Alan the Red of Brittany who built the castle at Richmond between 1071 and 1091. It was built on a bluff overlooking the River Swale.

In the 7th century, St Paulinus supposedly immersed thousands of people in a baptismal rite at Brompton-on-Swale and further downstream at Brafferton. Because so many had been baptised in this way, 19th-century writers have labelled the Swale as England's River Jordan. Mass baptisms are still carried out in the river around the Catterick Bridge area.

Economy 

Over the centuries, lead mining and cattle farming have been the main industries, but competition from the rest of the world saw them decline by the end of the 19th century. Some crop farming also took place, most notably during the warm periods of the 13th century.

Tourism now plays a major role in the economy of the river valley. The Yorkshire Dales Cycle Way follows the valley between Fremington and Gunnerside. The Coast to Coast Walk passes through Richmond to Reeth and is crossed at Keld by the Pennine Way, which goes through the upper valley from Buttertubs Pass to Muker.

Gallery

Lists

Settlements 

 Keld
 Muker
 Gunnerside
 Low Row
 Reeth
 Grinton
 Richmond
 Brompton-on-Swale
 Catterick Bridge
 Catterick
 Great Langton
 Little Fencote
 Morton-on-Swale
 Gatenby
 Maunby
 Pickhill
 Skipton-on-Swale
 Catton
 Baldersby St James
 Topcliffe
 Cundall
 Fawdington
 Brafferton
 Helperby
 Myton-on-Swale

Tributaries 

 Holme Ash Gill 
 Little Ash Gill 
 Great Ash Gill 
 Whitsunudale Beck 
 Blackburn Beck 
 Stonesdale Beck 
 Oldfield Gutter 
 Swinner Gill 
 West Arn Gill 
 Straw Beck 
 Routin Gill 
 Oxnop Gill 
 Shore Gill 
 Gunnerside Gill 
 Haverdale Beck 
 Mirk Gill 
 Birks Gill 
 Scabba Wath 
 Barney Beck 
 Arkle Beck 
 Cogden Beck 
 Hags Gill 
 Gill Beck 
 Gill Beck 
 Oxque Beck 
 Marske Beck 
 Clapgate Beck 
 Sand Beck 
 Colburn Beck 
 Skeeby Beck 
 Brough Beck 
 Fiddale Beck 
 Kiplin Beck 
 The Stell 
 Mill Beck 
 Bedale Beck 
 River Wiske 
 Cod Beck 
 Crakehill Beck 
 Cundall Beck 
 Arn Gill

Crossings 

 High Bridge (B6270) 
 Low Bridge 
 Park Bridge 
 Ivelet Bridge 
 Gunnerside Great Bridge (B6270)
 Isles Bridge 
 Scabba Wath Bridge 
 Grinton Bridge (B6270) 
 Downholme Bridge 
 Lownethwaite Bridge (A6108) 
 Bridge Street, Richmond 
 Station Road, Richmond (A6136) 
 A1(M) 
 Catterick Bridge (A6055) 
 Stoney Leigh Bridge 
 Bridge Street, Richmond 
 Swale Bridge (Wensleydale Railway) 
 Morton Bridge (A684) 
 Skipton Bridge (A61) 
 Topcliffe Bridge (A167) 
 A168 
 Thornton Bridge 
 Myton Bridge

References 

Swale
Swaledale
2Swale